The Fabulous is a South Korean streaming television series, starring Choi Min-ho and Chae Soo-bin. It premiered on December 23, 2022 on Netflix.

Synopsis 
Set in Seoul's fashion industry, The Fabulous depicts the stories of young adults who navigate their work, personal lives and relationships while struggling in a dynamic and competitive environment.

Cast

Main 
 Choi Min-ho as Ji Woo-min
 A freelance retoucher.
 Chae Soo-bin as Pyo Ji-eun
 A public relations manager of a luxury brand.

Supporting 
 Lee Sang-woon as Joseph
 A fashion designer with delicate artistic sensibility and pleasant charm.

 Park Hee-jung as Ye Seon-ho
 A top supermodel who loves herself.
 Kim Min-kyu as Shim Do-young
 A college student who dreams of being a model.
 Choi Hee-jin as Ahn Nam-hee
 A fashion magazine editor.
 Shin Dong-mi as Oh
 A representative of the luxury brand PR agency.
 Lee Mi-do as Hong Ji-seon
 A fashion stylist.
 Jeon Soo-kyeong as Jang Ok-jin 
 Joseph's mother and famous actress.
 Choi Won-myung as Lee Nam-jin
 Ji-eun's boyfriend and M&A expert.
 Lim Ki-hong as Thierry Henri
 The chief designer of the luxury brand Erlane.
 Lee Si-woo as Esther
 Joseph's smart assistant.
Byun Jun-seo as Cho Gang-woo
 A former fashion model and an assistant director for the commercial shooting team.
Kang Na-ru as Jung Hye-na
 A former supermodel.
Jeon Shin-hwan as Chief Do
 A famous photographer who runs a photo studio, and Woo-min's senior.
 Seo Soo-hee as JD 
 A super idol star who has a huge influence on the fashion world. causing the phenomenon to be sold out in stores around the world

Release 
On October 31, 2022, Netflix announced that the series, which was originally scheduled for release on November 4, was postponed due to the Seoul Halloween crowd crush tragedy. In late November 2022, it was announced that the series will be released on December 23.

References

External links
 
 
 

2022 South Korean television series debuts
2022 South Korean television series endings
2020s South Korean television series
2020s romantic comedy television series
Korean-language Netflix original programming
South Korean romantic comedy television series
Television shows set in Seoul
Works about the fashion industry